Goodrington carriage holding sidings are located in Goodrington, Torbay, England, and served from Paignton railway station.

Train types 
The sidings provide stabling for Great Western Railways British Rail Class 802 in between services to London Paddington station from Paignton railway station , and CrossCountry Class 220/221 Voyagers between services from Paignton railway station to Bristol Temple Meads railway station .

References 

 Railway sidings in England
 Rail transport in Devon
Paignton